The 2006 US Open Men's Qualifying Tournament ran from August 22 to 25. Sixteen players qualified for the Men's Singles Main Draw, which started on August 28.

Seeds
The seeded players are listed below. Players who have lost are listed with the round in which they exited.

 Frank Dancevic (second round)
 Denis Gremelmayr (qualifying competition)
 Jiří Vaněk (qualified)
 Stefano Galvani (second round)
 Dick Norman (first round)
 Rik de Voest (second round)
 Nicolás Lapentti (qualifying competition)
 Benjamin Becker (qualified)
 Juan Martín del Potro (qualified)
 Stefan Koubek (qualified)
 Kristian Pless (qualified)
 Evgeny Korolev (qualifying competition)
 Danai Udomchoke (first round)
 Kenneth Carlsen (second round)
 Thiago Alves (qualified)
 Paul Capdeville (second round)
 Alejandro Falla (qualified)
 Alexander Peya (qualifying competition)
 Albert Portas (first round)
 Cyril Saulnier (first round)
 Ricardo Mello (second round)
 Lu Yen-hsun (first round)
 Ivo Minář (qualifying competition)
 Ilija Bozoljac (second round)
 Tomáš Zíb (qualifying competition)
 Diego Hartfield (first round)
 Łukasz Kubot (qualified)
 Alex Bogdanovic (first round)
 Peter Luczak (qualifying competition)
 George Bastl (qualified)
 Robert Kendrick (qualified)
 Amer Delić (qualifying competition)

Qualifiers

Draw

First qualifier

Second qualifier

Third qualifier

Fourth qualifier

Fifth qualifier

Sixth qualifier

Seventh qualifier

Eighth qualifier

Ninth qualifier

Tenth qualifier

Eleventh qualifier

Twelfth qualifier

Thirteenth qualifier

Fourteenth qualifier

Fifteenth qualifier

Sixteenth qualifier

References
Results
2006 US Open – Men's draws and results at the International Tennis Federation

Men's Qualifying Singles
US Open (tennis) by year – Qualifying